The 2022 National Games netball events were held from September 26, 2022 to September 30, 2022 in the Multipurpose Hall of Bhavnagar.

Medal table

References

Netball in India
2022 National Games of India
September 2022 sports events in India